The Chesapeake and Ohio Railway No. 2716 is a class "K-4" 2-8-4 "Kanawha" (Berkshire) type steam locomotive built in 1943 by the American Locomotive Company (ALCO) for the Chesapeake and Ohio Railway (C&O). While most railroads referred to these 2-8-4 type locomotives as Berkshires, the C&O referred to them as Kanawhas after the Kanawha River, which flows through West Virginia. Used as a dual service locomotive, No. 2716 and its classmates served the C&O in a variety of duties until being retired from revenue service in 1956.

Donated to the Kentucky Railway Museum of New Haven, Kentucky in 1959, No. 2716 has been restored to operation in excursion service twice since its retirement from the C&O, first in 1981 for the Southern Railway's steam program until 1982, and again in 1996 for a few brief excursions for the Fort Wayne Railroad Historical Society (FWRHS) in New Haven, Indiana. The locomotive is undergoing an extensive rebuild to operating condition for a third excursion career, under lease by the Kentucky Steam Heritage Corporation.

History

Revenue service and first retirement

No. 2716 was the seventeenth member of 90 class "K-4" Kanawhas built for the C&O by the American Locomotive Company (ALCO) and the Lima Locomotive Works (LLW) between 1943 and 1947. These locomotives were used to haul heavy freight trains, as well as fast passenger trains. After only thirteen years in revenue service, the C&O retired No. 2716 in 1956 in light of dieselization. The C&O sold the majority of their Kanawhas for scrap, save for thirteen locomotives, including No. 2716.

In May 1959, the locomotive was donated to the Kentucky Railway Museum (KRM) in New Haven, Kentucky, where it sat on display. Twenty years later, the Clinchfield Railroad leased No. 2716 for their steam program. However, as the locomotive was being taken apart for restoration, the Clinchfield steam program was cancelled due to its parent company's, the Seaboard Coast Line Industries ouster of the Clinchfield Railroad General Manager Thomas D. Moore Jr. for participating in a scandal of misappropriated money, the end result being the return of the disassembled No. 2716 to the KRM.

Southern excursion service and second retirement
In 1980, No. 2716 was leased by the Southern Railway (SOU) to pull the longer and heavier passenger trains for their ever popular steam excursion program. The SOU brought the locomotive to their steam locomotive workshop in Irondale, Alabama, where  Master Mechanic Bill Purdie significantly altered the locomotive's appearance to appear if the SOU would have purchased a 2-8-4 type from new. No. 2716 was painted black with gold pinstriping as well as its headlight moved from its pilot to the center of its smokebox door, decorated with brass flag holders, and a brass eagle ornament. Additionally, the locomotive had its bell swinging from the top of its smokebox and carried the round "SR" emblems on its air compressor shields.

After operating on a test run on October 10 and 11, 1981, No. 2716 pulled its first SOU excursions on October 17 and 18, running a round-trip from Chattanooga, Tennessee to Rockwood, Tennessee. In November 1981, No. 2716 pulled excursion trains in Alabama and Georgia. In April 1982, the locomotive resumed its excursion duties, pulling trains through North Carolina, South Carolina, Tennessee, and Virginia. But three months later, a very inexperienced fireman damaged the locomotive's firebox, resulting No. 2716 to be taken out of excursion service for repairs and Nickel Plate Road No. 765, another 2-8-4, based in Indiana, was called into service as a replacement.

Following the merger between the Southern and the Norfolk and Western (N&W) railways to form the new Norfolk Southern Railway, No. 2716 was retired in favor of N&W No. 611 in 1982, along with N&W No. 1218 later on in 1987, serving as the main motive power for the steam program. It was put into storage at the Irondale workshop in 1985, after attempts to weld cracks in the firebox failed.

Brief excursion service with FWRHS and third retirement
After Norfolk Southern ended their steam program in late 1994, the Fort Wayne Railroad Historical Society (FWRHS), the owner of NKP No. 765, moved No. 2716 to their facilities a year later. In July 1996, the FWRHS restored the locomotive back to its original C&O appearance, repaired its firebox, and operated it on brief push-pull excursions between Logansport, Indiana and Gilman, Illinois. That same year, however, the inspectors of the Federal Railroad Administration (FRA) ordered to give either No. 2716 new flues, or No. 765 a complete overhaul; the latter was the result and the former would later make its final run in October 1996. The FWRHS decided to return No. 2716 to its display site at the Kentucky Railway Museum in 2001, and it remained on static display there for the next sixteen years.

Third restoration
On February 7, 2016, the Kentucky Steam Heritage Corporation (KSHC) was formed and announced that it had signed a long-term lease with the Kentucky Railway Museum to restore and operate No. 2716. By May 2018, the KSHC partnered with the CSX Transportation to move the locomotive to a former Louisville and Nashville rail yard in Ravenna, Kentucky to build a new rail-based tourist and community development center. In November 2018, the KSHC acquired three pieces of rolling stock from the Indiana Transportation Museum (ITM) such as an auxiliary tender No. 251958, an ex-Pennsylvania Railroad (PRR) railway post office car No. 6565, and baggage car No. 9036 for use behind No. 2716.

In January 2019, the Big Rivers Electric Corporation in Henderson, Kentucky salvaged a pair of Buckeye three-axle, roller bearing trucks from a flatcar, which was abandoned at their facility property in Hawesville, Kentucky; and donated them to the KSHC to replace the old friction bearing trucks underneath No. 2716's tender. From July 26 to 28, 2019, No. 2716 was moved out of the Kentucky Railway Museum for the first time in 18 years and went to Ravenna, Kentucky for restoration along with the help of CSX Transportation and R.J. Corman Railroad Group. The locomotive was officially moved into the Ravenna workshop on July 31 and the restoration work on No. 2716 started shortly after. During the restoration work, the locomotive's firebox side sheets, which were patched up twice during its two previous restorations in 1981 and 1996, were replaced with newly fabricated ones.

In March 2022, the KSHC was in exchange with the Pueblo Railway Museum (PRM) in Pueblo, Colorado to swap out two of No. 2716's non-functional air compressors with two fully-functional air compressors that came off of PRM's static display Santa Fe Class 2900 steam locomotive No. 2912. Once the restoration work was finished, the No. 2716 locomotive will eventually travel over the Naugatuck Railroad in Connecticut.

Notes

References

Bibliography

Further reading

External links

Kentucky Steam Heritage Corp.

2716
ALCO locomotives
2-8-4 locomotives
Individual locomotives of the United States
Standard gauge locomotives of the United States
Preserved steam locomotives of Kentucky
Railway locomotives introduced in 1943
Transportation in Estill County, Kentucky